The Clinic for Married Couples: Love and War, also known as Husbands and Wives: Love or War, is a South Korean television program. This omnibus show, broadcast every Friday, depicts the story of a husband and wife who seek divorce, while a panel of judges analyses the marital problems and suggests some solutions that might help the couple rediscover the meaning of marriage.

Cast

Season 1

Main
Shin Goo as the Chief judge
Jung Ae-ri as an Associate judge
Lee Ho-jae as an Associate judge

Recurring & Guest
Lee Won-jae
Choi Sung-joon
Min Ji-young
Lee Shi-eun
Lee Joo-suk
Yoo Ji-yun
Jang Hee-soo
Seo Kwon-soon
Kim Ae-ran
Lee Sang-mi
Lee Joo-hwa
Bae Do-wan
Baek Joon-ki
Kim Hee-jung

Season 2

Main
Jeon Moo-song as Performer / the Chief judge
Kang Seok-woo as Performer / the Chief judge
Kang Dong-woo as Human Sexuality expert
Kim Sook-gi as a Family Counseling expert
Baek Hye-kyung as a Neuropsychiatry professional
Lee Myung-sook as Family Law expert

Recurring & Guest
Choi Young-wan
Kim Sun-young
Han Geu-rim
Lee Suk-woo
Lee Jung-hoon
Kang Moon-hee
Jung Eun-bi
Yoon Chul-hyung
Kim Jung-kyun
Kim Deok-hyun
Choi Jung-won
Lee Shi-eun
Min Ji-young
Lee Jung-soo
Lee Joon-woo
Kim Nan-ah
Seo Jun-young
Kim Dong-hyun 
Narsha
Boyfriend
Seo Kwon-soon
Seo Min-woo
Lee Sang-mi

Idol Special

Fair Love
Kim Dong-jun as Seo Min-jae
Kim Ye-won as Yoo Eun-chae
Son Ji-hyun as Seo Young

Because I Love You
G.O as Joo Won
Go Woo-ri as Go Eun

My Girl's Man
Jang Su-won as Joon Hyung
Yura as Yoo Jung
Moon Joon-young as Soo Ho

Her Choice
Kang Tae-oh as Joo Won
Oh Seung-ah as Soo Young
Lee Min-hyuk as Hyun Woo

Awards & nominations

Spin-off web series
A spin-off web series titled NEW Love and War (NEW 사랑과 전쟁) will be streamed by KakaoTV starting October 14, 2021. Former KBS drama producer Sohn Nam-mok will produce and direct the project.

References

External links
  

Korean Broadcasting System television dramas
1999 South Korean television series debuts
Korean-language television shows
2009 South Korean television series endings
2000s South Korean television series
1990s South Korean television series
Television series by KBS Media
Television series by Celltrion Entertainment
Television series by Story TV